NMG can refer to:
 NMG Anil, Nepalese Music Artist
 Nation Media Group, Kenyan media company
 NMG (radio station), of National Hurricane Center
 Nederlandsche Meisjes Gilde (Dutch Girls Guild), later merged into Scouting Nederland
 New Music Gathering, American conference/festival  for contemporary music
 Myers Motors NmG (No More Gas), an electric car